The 2010 World Junior Curling Championships were held from March 5 to 14 at the Waldhaus Arena in Flims, Switzerland.

Men

Teams

Round-robin standings
Final round-robin standings

Round-robin results

Draw 1
Saturday, March 6, 14:00

Draw 2
Sunday, March 7, 9:00

Draw 3
Sunday, March 7, 19:00

Draw 4
Monday, March 8, 14:00

Draw 5
Tuesday, March 9, 9:00

Draw 6
Tuesday, March 9, 18:00

Draw 7
Wednesday, March 10, 14:00

Draw, 8
Thursday, March 11, 8:00

Draw, 9
Thursday, March 11, 17:00

Tiebreaker
Friday, April 12, 14:00

Playoffs

1 vs. 2 Game
Saturday, April 14, 12:00

3 vs. 4 Game
Saturday, April 14, 12:00

Semifinal
Saturday, April 14, 18:00

Bronze-medal game
Sunday, April 14, 13:00

Gold-medal game
Sunday, April 14, 13:00

Women

Teams

1Originally Solène Coulot was to play third until her untimely death on February 20, 2010.

Round-robin standings
Final round-robin standings

Round-robin results

Draw 1
Saturday, March 6, 9:00

Draw 2
Saturday, March 6, 19:00

Draw 3
Sunday, March 7, 14:00

Draw 4
Monday, March 8, 9:00

Draw 5
Monday, March 8, 19:00

Draw 6
Tuesday, March 9, 13:30

Draw 7
Wednesday, March 10, 9:00

Draw 8
Wednesday, March 10, 19:00

Draw 9
Thursday, March 11, 12:30

Playoffs

1 vs. 2 Game
Friday, April 12, 19:00

3 vs. 4 Game
Friday, April 12, 19:00

Semifinal
Saturday, April 14, 18:00

Bronze-medal game
Sunday, April 14, 9:00

Gold-medal game
Sunday, April 14, 9:00

External links
 

2010 in curling
2010
International curling competitions hosted by Switzerland
International sports competitions hosted by Switzerland
2010 in Swiss sport
Flims
2010 in youth sport
March 2010 sports events in Europe